Wipert von Blücher (14 July 1883 – 20 January 1963) was a German diplomat and the German ambassador to Finland from 12 May 1935 to late 1944. He was a doctor of law by education.

Wipert von Blücher served in World War I and entered the Foreign Office of Germany in 1918. He served in diplomatic duties in Stockholm, Buenos Aires, Teheran and Helsinki. He was not a member in the Nazi Party but a professional diplomat and retired in late 1944 after German ties to Finland were broken. Von Blücher was also a known name in Iranian studies.

References

1883 births
1963 deaths
People from Schwerin
German military personnel of World War I
Ambassadors of Germany to Finland
Ambassadors of Germany to Iran